Psilodercidae is a family of spiders first described as a subfamily of Ochyroceratidae by Machado in 1951 and raised to family rank by J. Wunderlich in 2008. These spiders can be distinguished by the "segestriid positioning" of their six eyes, the absence of leg bristles, strong apical bristles on the cymbium, and several pairs of spermathecae in females.

Genera

, the World Spider Catalog accepts the following genera, but it is relatively unstudied and may change as more information becomes available. In particular, Wunderlick remarked that Psiloderces is too broad and should be split into smaller, more distinct groups.

Althepus Thorell, 1898 — Asia
Flexicrurum Tong & Li, 2007 — China
Leclercera Deeleman-Reinhold, 1995 — Asia
Luzonacera F. Y. Li & S. Q. Li, 2017 — Philippines
Merizocera Fage, 1912 — Asia
Priscaleclercera Wunderlich, 2017 — Myanmar, Indonesia
Psiloderces Simon, 1892 — Asia
Qiongocera F. Y. Li & S. Q. Li, 2017 — China
Relictocera F. Y. Li & S. Q. Li, 2017 — Vietnam
Sinoderces F. Y. Li & S. Q. Li, 2017 — China
Thaiderces F. Y. Li & S. Q. Li, 2017 — Thailand

References

External links

 

 
Araneomorphae families